"Lovey Dovey" is a popular American rhythm and blues song originating in the 1950s and written by Eddie Curtis and Ahmet Ertegun, with the latter usually credited using his songwriter's pseudonym "Nugetre" (Ertegun spelled backwards). The song's initial recording by The Clovers remains the best known version, reaching No. 2 for five weeks on the R&B charts in 1954.

Background
The song deals with the singer's relationship with his sweetheart and is performed in a light-hearted style.

Cover Versions
Numerous artists have recorded the song. Cover versions have been recorded by:
 Clyde McPhatter (1959) reached No. 12 (R&B) and No. 49 (Pop)
 Buddy Knox in 1961, reached No. 25 pop
 Dick Dale (1962)
 The Coasters (1964)
 Bunny Sigler (1967) ("Lovey Dovey"/"You're So Fine"), reached No. 86 pop
 Otis Redding and Carla Thomas (1967) (released as a single in 1968, following Redding's death), reached No. 21 R&B and No. 60 pop. Also reached No. 17 UK R&B.
 Delbert McClinton (1976) on the album Genuine Cowhide

Legacy

Lyrics from "Lovey Dovey" (particularly "You're the cutest thing, That I ever did see, I really love your peaches, Wanna shake your tree"), were used by Steve Miller in his 1974 chart-topping single "The Joker". "The Joker" in turn was later sampled on another number one hit, "Angel" by Shaggy, giving Ahmet Ertegun credit as a songwriter on the latter.

References

External links

Southside Johnny & The Asbury Jukes songs
1954 singles
The Clovers songs
Clyde McPhatter songs
Buddy Knox songs
The Coasters songs
Otis Redding songs
Songs written by Ahmet Ertegun
Songs written by Eddie Curtis